Paris Simmons (born 2 January 1990 in London Borough of Lewisham) is a former English footballer who played for New Orleans Jesters in the USL Premier Development League.

Sporting career
Simmons made his club debut on 11 May 2008, the final day of the season, in a Premier League game, for Derby County against Reading as a substitute. He had the ball in the net within seconds of getting on the pitch but the whistle had already been blown for a foul by Darren Moore.

Simmons first team chances were restricted by Paul Jewell's squad reconstruction following relegation from the Premier League and, on 30 October 2008, he joined non-league Burton Albion on a month's loan. but returned without scoring a goal for the Brewers. He went out on loan again to League Two Lincoln City on 11 March 2009 in one-month deal. It was announced in May 2009 that he would not be offered a new deal by Derby at the end of his contract.

After joining Wolverhampton Wanderers on trial he signed for Conference North team Eastwood Town. In October he left Eastwood Town and, after spending time on trial with Polish club Śląsk Wrocław, joined Carlton Town.

Simmons moved to the United States in 2011 when he signed with the New Orleans Jesters in the USL Premier Development League. He made his debut for the Jesters in their first game of the 2011 season, a 3–1 loss to the El Paso Patriots, and scored his first goal on 21 May, in a 2–0 win over the West Texas United Sockers. He retired from professional football in 2013.

References

External links

1990 births
Living people
Footballers from Lewisham
English footballers
English expatriate footballers
Derby County F.C. players
Burton Albion F.C. players
Lincoln City F.C. players
Eastwood Town F.C. players
New Orleans Jesters players
Expatriate soccer players in the United States
Premier League players
National League (English football) players
USL League Two players
Carlton Town F.C. players
Association football forwards
English expatriate sportspeople in the United States